Lord's, also known as Lord's Cricket Ground, is a cricket venue in St John's Wood, London. Named after its founder, Thomas Lord, it is owned by Marylebone Cricket Club (MCC) and is the home of Middlesex County Cricket Club, the England and Wales Cricket Board (ECB), the European Cricket Council (ECC) and, until August 2005, the International Cricket Council (ICC). Lord's is widely referred to as the "Home of Cricket" and is home to the world's oldest sporting museum. The ground hosted its first Test match in 1884, England playing Australia. The first One Day International (ODI) on the ground took place in 1972, again between England and Australia, and the first Twenty20 International (T20I) on the ground was played between England and the Netherlands in 2009. In women's cricket, Lord's has hosted Women's One Day Internationals – the first of which was played between England and Australia in 1976 – and one Women's Twenty20 International, played between England and New Zealand in 2009.

In cricket, a five-wicket haul (also known as a "five-for" or "fifer") refers to a bowler taking five or more wickets in a single innings. This is regarded as a notable achievement, and those players who take a five-wicket haul in a Test at Lord's earn a place on the Lord's honours boards. 

The first bowler to take a five-wicket haul in a Test match at Lord's was England's Ted Peate in 1884 who finished with bowling figures of 6 wickets for 85 runs (6/85), bowling in the first innings of the first Test match played on the ground. Australia's Joey Palmer and England's George Ulyett both took five-wicket hauls during the same match, Ulyett taking seven wickets in Australia's second innings. The first bowler to take five wickets in an ODI on the ground was Australia's Gary Gilmour took 5 wickets for 48 runs against the West Indies in the 1975 Cricket World Cup Final. No five-wicket hauls have been taken in T20I cricket on the ground.
In women's cricket the first bowler to take a five-wicket haul on the ground in an international match was Cathryn Fitzpatrick who took 5 wickets for 47 runs against England in 1998.

Key

Test match five-wicket hauls

A total of 188 five-wicket hauls have been taken in Test matches at Lord's.

One Day International five-wicket hauls

A total of 18 five-wicket hauls have been taken in ODIs at Lord's.

Men's matches

Women's matches

Notes

References

External links
International five-wicket hauls at Lord's, CricInfo

Lord's
Lord's